Annabel Pitcher (born 1982) is a British children's writer.

Background
Pitcher was born in a village in West Yorkshire. She studied English Literature at Oxford University. Her first novel, My Sister Lives on the Mantelpiece, deals with the tragedy of a family torn apart by a terrorist attack. It almost instantly became a bestseller and has been translated into over twenty languages. It was shortlisted for the Red House Children's Book Award, the Galaxy Children's Book of the Year, the 2012 Carnegie Medal, and the 2011 Dylan Thomas Prize. It won a Royal Society of Authors' Betty Trask Award, the Hull Children's Book of the Year and the prestigious 2012 Branford Boase Award for most outstanding debut novel. Her books appeal to the ages 10–15 mostly.

Pitcher's second novel, Ketchup Clouds, won the Waterstones Children's Book Prize. It also collected the Edgar Allan Poe award in 2014 for 'Best Young Adult Novel', awarded by the Mystery Writers of America.

Before her first book was published, Annabel trained as a teacher and taught English at Wakefield Girls' High School.

Published books

References

External links
 
 

1982 births
Living people
21st-century English novelists
21st-century English women writers
English children's writers
English women novelists
Date of birth missing (living people)
Place of birth missing (living people)
Alumni of the University of Oxford
People from West Yorkshire